Izawa is a Japanese surname. Notable people with the surname include:

Atsushi Izawa (born 1989), Japanese footballer who plays for Ventforet Kofu
Hiroshi Izawa (born 1955), Japanese actor, voice actor, and director
Kyoko Izawa (born 1962), Japanese politician of the Liberal Democratic Party, a member of the House of Representatives in the Diet
Mann Izawa (born 1945), Japanese manga writer mostly known for his popular manga and anime series Lady Georgie
Tadashi Izawa (1895–1990), Japanese Shiatsu practitioner who introduced the derivative form Meridian Shiatsu
Takio Izawa (1869–1949), Japanese politician of the early 20th century
Takuya Izawa (born 1984), Japanese racing driver
Toshimitsu Izawa (born 1968), Japanese professional golfer

Japanese-language surnames